The Breaking of the World is the fifteenth studio album by American progressive rock band Glass Hammer, released on March 31, 2015. It is the band's first album since the departure of vocalist Jon Davison, who left in 2014 to concentrate on his efforts in Yes.

Track listing

Personnel 

Glass Hammer
 Carl Groves – lead vocals
 Susie Bogdanowicz – lead and backing vocals
 Fred Schendel –  keyboards, guitars, lead vocals and backing vocals
 Alan Shikoh – electric, acoustic and classical guitars
 Steve Babb – bass, keyboards, backing vocals
 Aaron Raulston – drums

Production
 Fred Schendel and Steve Babb – producing
 Bob Katz - mastering
 Michal Xaay Loranc - cover art, booklet art

Additional musicians
 Steve Unruh - violin on “Bandwagon”, flute on “Babylon”
 Michele Lynn - lead vocals on “Haunted” bridge, backing vocals on “Third Floor”

References 

Glass Hammer albums
2015 albums